Christopher Columbus High School is a private, Roman Catholic, college-preparatory high school, conducted by the Marist Brothers in the Westchester census-designated place of Miami Dade County, Florida. It was established in 1958 and was taken over by the Marist Brothers in 1959. It has over 100 teachers, administrators, faculty, staff, and an enrollment of 1,700 students. It was selected, for the fourth time in a row, as one of the "Top 50 Catholic High Schools" in the United States by the Catholic High School Honor Roll in 2008.

History
In 1958, Christopher Columbus High School was built in an area that was then surrounded by Everglades swampland. The school was established by the Diocese of Miami at the request of the Archbishop of Miami Coleman F. Carroll to continue the secondary education program at St. Theresa Catholic School in Coral Gables.

The school opened with two and a half buildings and an enrollment of approximately 150 students. The Marist Brothers assumed the direction of the school in 1959.   Presently the Columbus campus extends over 24 acres. In addition to the four major academic buildings, there is the Abraham Science Building, the Lawrence-Bell Media Center, the Howard Korth Music, and Athletic Center and the Mas Technology Complex. Athletic facilities include varsity athletic fields, a baseball complex, outdoor basketball courts, tennis courts, a gymnasium, track, and weight room.

In May 2018, Columbus High School made national headlines after controversy centered around the display of a live caged tiger during the school's "jungle-themed" prom. Videos and images captured the tiger pacing in a metal enclosure. The school's principal David Pugh expressed regret for the school administration decision to allow the use of animal entertainment, stating that it did not reflect the school's Catholic values.

Today, Columbus has an enrollment of approximately 1,700 students and over 15,000 alumni.

Columbus' rival school is the only other all-male, Roman Catholic school in Miami-Dade County, Belen Jesuit Preparatory School. The two schools' rivalry is often limited to athletics (though Columbus competes on the more competitive level across all sports), the rivalry often extends beyond sports and into local politics and culture.

Admission and academics 
As a Catholic and Marist institution, the school does not discriminate on the basis of race or religion in its admissions process. The school is funded by tuition with significant discounts offered for 2nd and 3rd children enrolled in the school.  Financial aid is available for those who qualify.

Columbus is an Elite Smart Showcase School and a participating school in the Catholic High School Honor Roll for 2012–2013.

In order to graduate, students require twenty-four credits and a grade point average (GPA) of at least 2.0. They must also complete one hundred hours of community service by the end of their senior year. The academics at Columbus are based on a phasing system: Phase 2 classes are for the academically challenged who require more time to absorb a given subject, Phase 3 classes are for average students, Phase 4 refers to honors classes for the academically gifted, and Phase 5 refers to Advanced Placement (AP) classes, which have a college-level format and where academically motivated students have the opportunity to gain college credit should they earn the proper score on the AP exam. Depending on a given phase of a class, a student will earn a certain number of points, which are then weighted and averaged to generate a student's GPA, the average GPA being a 3.2.  Columbus has more students taking AP classes than any other Catholic school in Miami-Dade County and their passing averages on AP exams are five times higher than the state and national averages.

Curriculum design
Dual-enrollment classes are offered through St Thomas University, Barry University and Florida International University.

Mas Family Scholars Program
Started in the 2005–2006 school year, the Mas Family Scholars Program is an accelerated program at Christopher Columbus High School. The program was started by the Mas Family, who founded MasTec, Inc., a telecommunications company.   In addition to having an advanced curriculum, the students in the program participate in extracurricular activities. Mas Scholars are encouraged to participate in sports and to encompass the ideal of the student athlete. Mas Scholars

The program is a continuing collaborative effort between Columbus and the Mas Family. Brothers Jorge Mas, Juan Carlos Mas, and Jose Mas, sons of the late Jorge Mas Canosa, founder of MasTec, Inc. and The Cuban American National Foundation (CANF), are all Columbus graduates.

Program requirements : 
 Top 10% score in the Columbus Entrance Exam
 Recommendation from junior high school principal
 Completion of enrichment courses during the summer
 A minimum of four Honors/AP/Dual Enrollment courses during junior year and five during senior year
 B+ or higher cumulative GPA.
 Involvement in minimally 1 extracurricular activity per year
 Attendance at a minimum of two enrichment activities during the year
 Service to the community

Program benefits :
 Students are ensured to complete a minimum of 30 college credits prior to graduation
 Periodic enrichment activities - Personal guidance and academic counseling
 Periodic status meetings with program director to ensure successful completion of courses
 College counseling and organized visits to universities
 Gateway to College
 Columbus College and Career Counselors will arrange periodic meetings with parents and students to explore college and career opportunities
 Preparation for PSAT/SAT examinations
 SAT 2 examinations upon completion of AP or Honors courses
 Induction into Honor Societies
Ivy League college tours include: Dartmouth College, Harvard University, Massachusetts Institute of Technology, Yale University, Brown University, Columbia University, Princeton University, and University of Pennsylvania.
Field trips: Past Mas Scholar field trips have included visits to the Everglades National Park, Fairchild Tropical Botanical Gardens, operas, theatre, museums, Hispanic Heritage Lectures, and art and music lectures.

Students and faculty
The students are 84% Hispanic, 13% White, 2% African-American, and 1% combination of Asian/Pacific, Pacific Islander and Native American/Alaskan. The student-teacher ratio at Christopher Columbus High School is about 15:1. The professional staff includes 17 Marist Brothers, 100 laypersons; 2 librarians/media specialists and 9 counselors/advisors; 45% hold an advanced degree; 60% have over 20 years of teaching experience, and half have been with the school well over 15 years. Many Marist Brothers hold positions at Columbus including president, guidance counselors, career and college advisors, and teachers.

Clubs and social life

Although the school is an all-boy institution, the social formation of the students includes girls from neighboring co-ed St. Brendan High School in after-school clubs.  Our Lady of Lourdes Academy, the Catholic all-girls sister school to Columbus, handles the cheerleading for the Columbus sports teams.  Christopher Columbus High School also plays host to both Homecoming and Prom events each year for their students and their dates.

Columbus is home to one of the best broadcast journalism programs in the country (CCNN Live). They have been three times Student Television Network National Crazy 8 champions. They have also been recognized by the National Scholastic Press Association, Florida Scholastic Press Association, and National Federation of High School (NFHS). They have won 29 Suncoast Chapter of the National Academy of Television Arts & Sciences Student Production Awards (Emmys) and 5 National Academy of Television Arts & Sciences National Awards.

Athletics 

A member of the Florida High School Activities Association and the Greater Miami Athletic Conference, Columbus is the only private school in the state of Florida to compete at the 8A level.
 
At Columbus, students also compete in non GMAC clubs such as: Roller Hockey, Fishing, Scuba Diving, and Personal Fitness. 
Varsity level sports offered are: baseball, basketball, football, volleyball, hockey, soccer, bowling, cross country, golf, lacrosse, swimming, diving, tennis, track and field, water polo and wrestling.

Junior varsity level sports include: baseball, basketball, football, volleyball, hockey, soccer, wrestling and lacrosse.
Freshman level sports offered are: baseball, basketball, football and volleyball.

In 2009, Christopher Columbus High School won the Dodge Sunshine Cup All-Sports Award for boys' athletics programs in Class 6A.

State championships
Baseball: 2003, 2015
Football: 2019, 2022
Boys cross country: 1997, 2008, 2009, 2010, 2020
Boys tennis: 1987
Boys track and field: 2018, 2019
Boys soccer: 2014

Boys basketball: 2022, 2023

Additionally, Columbus won the Miami Heralds All-Dade Boys' Major Sports Award in 2008 and 2009.

Head football coach Chris Merritt was part of Team USA's coaching staff for the inaugural International Federation of American Football Junior World Championship in 2009. One player from Columbus competed on the team, which won the tournament.

Christopher Columbus' baseball program was ranked the number one baseball team in America during the 2009-2010 year. Currently, Columbus competes at the 8A division.

Campus 

The school has technology throughout all 8 academic buildings, including campus-wide Wi-Fi, Smart Boards and LCD projectors in all classrooms, fully-equipped science labs, a media center, and a technology complex with a digital based library, computer labs, and a media production studio

There are four main academic buildings that have a media center that contains a technical resource center, an auditorium, a TV news studio, a chemistry laboratory, a concession stand, and several offices. The science building contains a physics and chemistry lab. The school also has several computer labs, gymnasium, a tennis complex, a baseball complex, a weight room, football field, and a concrete track which is used as a parking lot.

In 2008, Christopher Columbus High School opened  the three-story "Mas Technology Complex", which contains administrative offices, a conference room, computer labs, a large library, a production studio, a recording room, and a school clothing store.

Additionally, in 2019, the school proposed the new Lemonis Building for Columbus. It offers a music, art, and T.V. production classes for the student body. It has a center for robotics and the Student Activities Office (SAC), it too has the Silva Concessions which sells lunch and snacks for the students. During the construction of the Lemonis building the "S" building was demolished and the indoor basketball court was remodeled. However, the most important thing about remodeling the court was the addition of the student recovery center where the school offers hydrotherapy and massages for students participating in sports.

Notable alumni

Law/public service
 Richard Blanco - '85, U.S. inaugural poet 
 Raoul G. Cantero, III - '78, Justice of Florida Supreme Court.
 Carlos A. Gimenez - '72,  U.S. Representative for Florida's 26th congressional district, Miami-Dade County Mayor, District 7 Commissioner, city manager and Fire Chief of Miami
Javier Fernandez - '94, State Representative for District 114 in the Florida House of Representatives, lawyer and public servant.
 Pedro José Greer - Presidential Medal of Freedom recipient
 Victor E. Renuart, Jr. - '67, Air Force general, commander of United States Northern Command and North American Aerospace Defense Command
 John D. Couriel - '93, Justice of Florida Supreme Court.

Journalism/entertainment
 Patrick Farrell - '77, photojournalist and Pulitzer Prize winner 
 Enrique Murciano - '91, actor, CBS drama Without a Trace and films Traffic, Speed 2: Cruise Control, The Lost City, Black Hawk Down
 John M. Higgins - '79, journalist, business editor of Broadcasting & Cable 
 Carlos Maza - '06, journalist, formerly of Vox Media
 Brian Regan - '76, American stand-up comedian
 James F. O'Brien - '88, Oscar for Scientific and Technical Achievement 
 Juan M Fernandez - 86’ KCAL 9 CBS Los Angeles

Business people
 Marcus Lemonis - '91, entrepreneur, television personality and CEO of Camping World
 Jorge Mas - '81, Chairman of MasTec
 Carlos A. Rodriguez - '82, CEO of Automatic Data Processing & Board member of Automatic Data Processing and Hubell Inc.

Athletes
 Eddy Alvarez - '08, 2014 Sochi Olympics Team USA member, short track speed skating; first Cuban-American male speedskater to go to Winter Olympics for USA
 Augie Diaz - '72, world-class sailor

Baseball
 Orestes Destrade - '80, player for Florida Marlins, New York Yankees, Pittsburgh Pirates and ESPN analyst on Baseball Tonight.
 Pedro Grifol - coach for Kansas City Royals
 Jon Jay - '03, player for Chicago White Sox
 Ed Lynch - '73, pitcher for New York Mets and general manager for Chicago Cubs
 Paul Mainieri -'75, collegiate baseball and Baseball America's National Coach of the Year, led LSU to 2009 National Championship
 Izzy Molina - '90, player for Oakland A's and Baltimore Orioles
 Rob Murphy - '78, pitcher for Cincinnati Reds, Boston Red Sox, Seattle Mariners, Houston Astros, St. Louis Cardinals, New York Yankees,  Los Angeles Dodgers and Florida Marlins; pitched collegiately for University of Florida
 Andrew Suarez - '11, pitcher for the San Francisco Giants and for the Miami Hurricanes, selected in 2011 MLB Draft
Bryan Garcia - '13 - pitcher for the Detroit Tigers, and for the Miami Hurricanes, selected in the 2016 MLB draft

Football
 Mario Cristobal - '88, University of Miami 2x National Champion ('89, '91), current University of Miami head coach
 Joaquin Gonzalez - '97, offensive tackle for the Cleveland Browns, Indianapolis Colts, and the University of Miami
 Brian Griese - '93, quarterback for Denver Broncos, Miami Dolphins and Chicago Bears, 1997 National Champion, University of Michigan
 Alonzo Highsmith - '83, running back for the University of Miami, Houston Oilers, Dallas Cowboys, and Tampa Bay Buccaneers; professional boxer; currently personnel executive for the Seattle Seahawks
 Carlos Huerta - '87, placekicker for Chicago Bears and the St. Louis Rams
 Patrick Lee - '03, cornerback for Auburn University and the Green Bay Packers. 2011 Super Bowl champion
 Mike Shula - '83, University of Alabama football coach, current quarterbacks coach for NFL Denver Broncos
 Mike Whittington - '76, University of Notre Dame, New York Giants and Memphis Showboats linebacker
 C. J. Henderson - '17, cornerback for Carolina Panthers
 Josh Uche - '16, linebacker for New England Patriots
 Deon Bush - '12, safety for Chicago Bears
 Tyler Harrell - '18, wide receiver for the Alabama Crimson Tide

References

External links

Marist Brothers schools
Catholic secondary schools in Florida
Roman Catholic Archdiocese of Miami
Private high schools in Miami-Dade County, Florida
Boys' schools in the United States
Educational institutions established in 1958
1958 establishments in Florida
Westchester, Florida